The 1940–1945 Colonial War Effort Medal was a Belgian war service medal established by royal decree of the Regent on 30 January 1947 and awarded to government civil servants, magistrates, volunteer members of the female auxiliary service, missionaries, civilian agents of the different departments and civilians who served honourably for at least one year in the Belgian Congo or Ruanda-Urundi colonies of the Kingdom of Belgium in Africa between 10 May 1940 and 7 May 1945.

Persons eligible for the award of both the 1940–1945 Colonial War Effort Medal and the 1940–1945 African War Medal could only receive one of the two, usually the one earned for the longest service.

Award description
The 1940–1945 Colonial War Effort Medal was a 31mm wide by 52mm high bronze rectangular medal with sloping upper corners. Its obverse bore at its upper center an embossed five pointed star above the relief inscription on five rows "1940" "1945" "PRO PATRIA" "ET" "VICTORIA" between vertical laurel leaves. The smooth reverse was plain.

The medal is suspended by a ring through a lateral suspension hole from a 37mm wide yellow silk moiré ribbon with 5mm wide light blue edge stripes.

Notable recipients (partial list)
Governor-General Pierre Ryckmans
Léo Pétillon

See also

 List of Orders, Decorations and Medals of the Kingdom of Belgium

References

Other sources
 Quinot H., 1950, Recueil illustré des décorations belges et congolaises, 4e Edition. (Hasselt)
 Cornet R., 1982, Recueil des dispositions légales et réglementaires régissant les ordres nationaux belges. 2e Ed. N.pl.,  (Brussels)
 Borné A.C., 1985, Distinctions honorifiques de la Belgique, 1830-1985 (Brussels)

External links
Bibliothèque royale de Belgique (In French)
Les Ordres Nationaux Belges (In French)
ARS MORIENDI Notables from Belgian history (In French and Dutch)

Military awards and decorations of Belgium
Awards established in 1947
1947 establishments in Belgium
Belgian Congo in World War II